Ayelet Zurer (born ) is an Israeli actress. She was nominated for awards at the Jerusalem Film Festival, the Israeli Academy Awards and the Israeli Television Academy Awards. She won Best Actress awards for her roles in the Israeli film Nina's Tragedies and Betipul. She also portrays Vanessa Fisk in Marvel Television's Netflix series Daredevil (2015–18).

Early life and personal life 
Ayelet Zurer was born and raised in Tel Aviv, Israel, to a Jewish family. Her mother was born in Czechoslovakia and survived the Holocaust by hiding in a convent. She immigrated to Israel in the 1950s. Her Israeli-born father is of Russian-Jewish descent. She has described her parents as "working-class people".

During her service in the Israel Defense Forces, Zurer was a soldier in the military band of the Northern Command.

After finishing her military service, Zurer studied acting for three years at the Performing Arts Studio founded by Yoram Loewenstein. She moved to the United States and studied with George Morison at the Actor's Workshop in New York City.

In 2003, she married her former Israeli surfing instructor, Gilad Londovski. They have a son and reside in Los Angeles.

Television and film career

Television

In 1991, Zurer moved back to Israel. In 1992, she starred in the television series Inyan Shel Zman, and in 1993, she played Debbie in the Israeli comedy film Nikmato shel Itzik Finkelstein (Revenge of Itzik Finkelstein). During this time she also participated in the cable television show Yetziat Hirum. In 1997, Zurer played the role of Shira Steinberg in the television show Florentin on Israeli Channel 2. Several Israeli television series followed: in 2000, Zinzana, and in 2002, Shalva and Ha'Block.

In 2004 when she was cast in Steven Spielberg's Munich, she moved with her family to California.

In 2005, she starred in another Israeli television series, Betipul, a drama about a psychologist and his patients' therapy process. She plays Na'ama Lerner, a patient who starts a romance with the doctor. The series won her a Best Actress award from the Israeli Television Academy and was remade as the HBO series In Treatment. The following year Zurer participated in an Israeli sketch comedy television show called Gomrot Holchot that deals with the world of young women; relationships, marriage, sex, and career. The show is based on the British sketch comedy show Smack the Pony.

In 2013, Zurer starred in the Israeli series Shtisel as an attractive widow, Elisheva Rotstein. In 2015, she starred in Daredevil as Vanessa Marianna, an art gallery owner. The series is part of the Marvel Cinematic Universe. Zurer reprised her role in the third season (2018) of Daredevil.

In November 2020, Zurer was cast in a recurring role on the third season of the Netflix psychological thriller series You. She stars in the 2021 dramatic-thriller Losing Alice on Apple TV+.

Film 

In 1998 she played the lead in the film Ahava Asura (a.k.a. The Dybbuk of the Holy Apple Field). In 2001, she starred in the movies Laila Lelo Lola and Kikar Ha'Halomot. In 2003, she starred in Nina's Tragedies, portraying the title character, Nina, a young woman who has to rebuild her life after the death of her husband. She won an Israeli Academy Award for Best Actress for this role.

Zurer appeared in Munich (2005), where she played Avner Kaufman's wife. She played a terrorist in the American thriller Vantage Point. In 2007, she starred in Fugitive Pieces, in which a troubled young Holocaust survivor falls in love with her character. She played a nurse who falls in love with the title character in Adam Resurrected (2008).

In April 2008, Zurer was cast as the female lead, Vittoria Vetra, in The Da Vinci Code sequel, Angels & Demons. She played the lead role in the 2011 film Hide Away (a.k.a. "A Year in Mooring"), and played Superman's mother, Lara Lor-Van, in the reboot of the Superman franchise, Man of Steel (2013).

Filmography

Film

Television

Awards

See also
 Television in Israel
 Israeli cinema

References

External links 
 
 Ayelet Zurer at Theiapolis
 
 Ayelet Zurer at E-Online 
 
 

1969 births
Living people
Actresses from Tel Aviv
Israeli expatriates in the United States
Israeli film actresses
Israeli television actresses
Jewish Israeli actresses
Israeli female military personnel
20th-century Israeli actresses
21st-century Israeli actresses
Israeli people of Czechoslovak-Jewish descent